This list of 2015 motorsport champions is a list of national or international auto racing series with championships decided by the points or positions earned by a driver from multiple races where the season was completed during the 2015 calendar year.

Open wheel racing

Sports car and GT

Stock car racing

Touring car racing

Rallying

Drifting

Truck racing

Off-road racing

Motorcycles

Road racing

Air racing

Water surface racing

Outboard powerboat racing

Radio-controlled racing

1:8 On-Road

1:10 Off-Road

1:10 Electric Touring Car

1:8 Off-Road

1:12 On-Road

1:10 200mm Nitro Touring Car

1:5 Large Scale On-Road

1:6 Large Scale Off-Road

See also
 List of motorsport championships
 2015 in motorsports

References

 Champions
2015